The Provost of Elgin was the head of the Elgin burgh council in Scotland. Provosts were elected by the council and served not only as the chairman of that body, but as a figurehead for the town.

Elgin Town Council ceased to exist in May 1975, its duties being taken over by Moray District Council and Grampian Regional Council.

Each of the 32 Scottish local authorities elects a convener or provost, but it is only the four main cities, Glasgow, Edinburgh, Aberdeen and Dundee that have a Lord Provost. This is enshrined in the Local Government etc. (Scotland) Act 1994.

Elgin Town Council decided to call the royal burgh a city in the mid 19th century. The provost of a city is entitled to the title “lord provost”. However, Elgin’s claim to be a city was never ratified by either the Lord Lyon or the Convention of Royal Burghs. In spite of this the council retained the title of lord provost for their chief magistrate.

Provosts

 1261 Thomas Wyseman
 1272 Adam son of Stephen and Patrick Heroc
 1330 Walter son of Ralph
 1343 Walter son of Ralph
 1488 James Douglas
 1521–1525  David Douglas of Pittendreich
 1529–1530  William Douglas
 1538-1539 William Gaderer (or Gatherer)
 1539-1540 John Young
 1540-1542 William Gaderer
 1542-1543 John Young
 1543-1547 William Gaderer
 1547-1548 St Giles
 1548-1549 William Hay of Mayne
 1549-1553 Alexander Innes
 1553-1554 William Innes
 1554-1557 Alexander Douglas
 1557-1558 William Gaderar
 1559-1561 Alexander Douglas
 1565-1568 John Annand
 1568-1569 Alexander Douglas
 1569-1574 John Annand of Morristoun
 1574-1575 Alexander Douglas
 1575-1583 John Annand
 1583-1584 Thomas Young
 1584-1585 James Douglas of Shutting Acres
 1585-1586 John Annand
 1586-1587 James Douglas
 1589-1594 John Annand
 1594-1600 Alexander Seton, Lord Urquhart & Baron of Fyvie
 1600-1601 James Douglas of Shutting Acres
 1601-1607 Alexander Seton, 1st Earl of Dunfermline
 1609-1610 James Douglas of Barflethills
 1610-1611 Alexander Pringhill
 1611-1612 James Rutherford
 1612-1613 Alexander Pringhill
 1613-1615 James Douglas of Barflethills
 1615-1623 James Rutherford
 1623-1631 Gavin Douglas of Shutting Acres
 1631-1643 John Hay
 1643-1645 Gavin Douglas of Morristoun
 1645-1650 John Hay
 1650-1653 John Douglas of Morristoun
 1653-1655 John Hay
 1655-1658 John Douglas of Morristoun
 1658-1664 George Cumming of Lochtervandich
 1664-1665 William Cumming of Banff
 1665-1668 Thomas Calder
 1668-1687 George Cumming of Lochtervandich
 1688-1689 David Stewart
 1689-1690 William Calder of Spynie
 1690-1700 William King of Newmill
 1700-1705 James, Lord Duffus
 1705-1708 William Sutherland of Mostowie
 1708-1711 William King of Newmill
 1711-1714 George Innes of Inkinty
 1714-1717 Sir Archibald Dunbar of Thunderton
 1717-1720 Robert Innes MD
 1720-1723 James Innes MD
 1723-1726 Robert Innes MD
 1726-1729 James Innes MD
 1729-1731 James Anderson of Linkwood (d.1731)
 1731-1734 James Innes MD
 1734-1737 John Robertson MD
 1737-1740 James Innes, MD
 1740-1743 William Anderson of Linkwood
 1743-1746 James Stephen, Merchant
 1746-1749 John Duff Sr, Merchant
 1749-1752 Alexander Brodie of Windyhills
 1752-1755 James Robertson of Bishopmill
 1755-1758 Alexander Brodie of Windyhills
 1758-1761 James Robertson of Bishopmill
 1761-1764 Alexander Brodie of Windyhills
 1764-1767 James Robertson of Bishopmill
 1767-1770 Alexander Brodie of Windyhills
 1770-1771 Thomas Stephen, Merchant
 1771-1774 John Duff, Merchant
 1774-1775 Alexander Brodie of Windyhills
 1775-1778 John Duff, Merchant
 1778-1779 Alexander Brodie of Windyhills
 1779-1782 John Duff, Merchant
 1782-1785 George Brown, Linkwood
 1785-1788 John Duff, Merchant
 1788-1791 George Brown, Linkwood
 1791-1792 John Duff, Merchant
 1792-1795 Alexander Brander, Merchant
 1795-1798 George Brown, Linkwood
 1798-1799 Alexander Brander, Merchant
 1799-1802 George Brown, Linkwood
 1802-1803 Joseph King of Newmill
 1803-1806 George Brown, Linkwood
 1806-1809 Joseph King of Newmill
 1809-1812 George Brown, Linkwood
 1812-1815 George Fenton, Writer
 1815-1816 George Brown, Linkwood
 1816-1819 Colonel Francis William Grant, MP
 1819-1820 Sir Archibald Dunbar of Northfield, Baronet
 1820-1823 Alexander Innes, Merchant
 1823-1826 Peter Nicholson, Merchant
 1826-1829 Alexander Innes, Merchant
 1829-1832 John Lawson, Jr, Banker
 1832-1833 James Petrie, Merchant
This was the last election under the old system; the Reform Bill having come into operation at the election in November 1833.
 1833-1835 William Gauldie, Merchant
 1835-1839 John McKimmie, Merchant
 1839-1840 Alexander Young, Banker
 1840-1842 John McKimmie, Merchant
 1842-1848 James Wilson
 1848–1863 James Grant, solicitor
 1863-1869 Alexander Russell, Publisher
 1869-1875 Alexander Cameron of Mainhouse
 1875-1881 William Culbard, Merchant
 1881-1890 James Black, Publisher
 1890-1896 William Law, Ironmonger
 1896-1899 William Grant, Banker
 1899-1905 John Young, Chemist
 1905-1908 James Christie, Merchant
 1908-1913 Charles Duff Wilson, Jeweller
 1919-1925 William Ramsay of Longmorn
 1925-1931 John Wittet
 1931-1937 Robert Cumming Hamilton 
 1937-1940 Murdo Mackenzie
 1940-1942 Charles Alexander Christie
 1942-1949 Edward Stroud Harrison
 1949-1952 John Brodie
 1952-1955 Ronald Grant Fraser
 1955-1961 William Batchen Munro
 1961-1964 Isobel Ann Duncan
 1964-1970 George Alexander Smith
 1970-1971 George Edgar
 1971-1975 Donald McLeman McIntosh

References
Mackintosh, Herbert B: Elgin Past and Present, Elgin, 1914

Politics of the county of Banff
Elgin, Provosts of
Provosts